Yeulin V. Willett (born July 30, 1958) is an attorney and politician from Grand Junction, Colorado. A Republican, he represented District 54 in the Colorado House of Representatives.

Education
Willett earned an undergraduate degree in Business/Economics (1980) and a Juris Doctor degree (1984), both from the University of Colorado at Boulder.

Elections
Willett was first elected to the state house in 2014. In the general election that year, he won the race with 63.4% of the total vote, beating three other candidates. In the 2016 general election, he beat his Democratic opponent — his only opposition — with 77.08% of the vote. In early 2018 Willett announced that he would not be seeking re-election in the 2018 elections.

References

External links
 Campaign website
 State House website

1958 births
21st-century American politicians
Living people
Republican Party members of the Colorado House of Representatives
University of Colorado Boulder alumni
University of Colorado Law School alumni
People from Mesa County, Colorado